Remember Shakti – Saturday Night in Bombay is a live album by the world fusion band Remember Shakti released in November 2001 on the Verve label. The live set features John McLaughlin on Guitar, U. Srinivas on Mandolin, Vikku Selvaganesh playing Kanjira, Ghatam, Mridangam, all Indian percussion instruments, Zakir Hussain on Tabla and a number of Indian guest musicians.

Track listing
 "Luki" (John McLaughlin) – 
 "Shringar" (Shivkumar Sharma) – 
 "Giriraj Sudha" (U. Srinivas) – 
 "Bell'alla" (Zakir Hussain) –

Personnel
 U. Srinivas – Electric Mandolin
 Zakir Hussain – Tabla
 John McLaughlin – Guitar
 Vikku Selvaganesh – Kanjira, Ghatam, Mridangam, Indian percussion

Guest musicians
 Shankar Mahadeven – Vocals
 Debashish Bhattacharya – Hindustani slide guitar
 Bhavani Shankar – Dholak
 Roshen Ali – Dholak
 Aziz – Dholak
 Taufiq Qureshi – def
 Shivkumar Sharma – Santoor
 A.K. Pallanivel – Tavil
 Sivamani – Drums and percussion

Other credits
 Max Costa – Engineer
 Sven Hoffman – Engineer
 Lïla Guilloteau – Assistant coordinator

References

2001 live albums
Live world music albums
Shakti (band) albums